HMS Cossack was a Royal Navy  destroyer launched on 10 May 1944.

Operational Service
Cossack became leader of the 8th Destroyer Squadron in 1945, remaining leader of the Flotilla until 1956. Between 1950 and 1952 she was commanded by Varyl Begg. She saw action at the Battle of Pusan Perimeter during the Korean War. The ship was carrying a cargo of rubber bound for a Chinese port in contravention of a United Nations embargo. Nancy Moller was escorted back to Singapore.

Cossack supported Operation Grapple, the series of British nuclear weapons tests in 1957. On 8 December 1959 she arrived back at Devonport Dockyard after 15 years service in the Far East. The ship was scrapped in 1961.

References

Publications

 
 
 
 
 
 

 

Korean War destroyers of the United Kingdom
C-class destroyers (1943) of the Royal Navy
1944 ships
Ships built on the River Tyne
Ships built by Vickers Armstrong